The United States Post Office is a historic building in Schuyler, Nebraska. It was built by Busboom & Rauh in 1940, and designed in the Moderne style by Louis Simon. Inside, there is a mural by Philip von Saltza. The building has been listed on the National Register of Historic Places since May 11, 1992.

References

National Register of Historic Places in Colfax County, Nebraska
Moderne architecture in the United States
Post office buildings on the National Register of Historic Places in Nebraska
Government buildings completed in 1940
1940 establishments in Nebraska